Australian pairing of Thanasi Kokkinakis and Benjamin Mitchell defeated compatriots Alex Bolt and Andrew Whittington, 6–3, 6–2, to be the inaugural champions.

Seeds

Draw

Draw

References
 Main Draw

Melbourne Challenger - Doubles
2013 Doubles
2013 in Australian tennis